Alvord Independent School District is a public school district based in Alvord, Texas (USA). The district is located in north central Wise County and extends into a small portion of southern Montague County. The district operates one high school, Alvord High School.

Finances
As of the 2010-2011 school year, the appraised valuation of property in the district was $299,580,000. The maintenance tax rate was $0.117 and the bond tax rate was $0.019 per $100 of appraised valuation.

Academic achievement
In 2011, the school district was rated "recognized" by the Texas Education Agency.  Thirty-five percent of districts in Texas in 2011 received the same rating. No state accountability ratings will be given to districts in 2012. A school district in Texas can receive one of four possible rankings from the Texas Education Agency: Exemplary (the highest possible ranking), Recognized, Academically Acceptable, and Academically Unacceptable (the lowest possible ranking).

Historical district TEA accountability ratings
2011: Recognized
2010: Recognized
2009: Exemplary
2008: Recognized
2007: Recognized
2006: Recognized
2005: Recognized
2004: Recognized

Schools
In the 2011-2012 school year, the district had students in three schools.
Alvord High School (grades 9–12)
A new band hall was completed in the winter of 2008 which is attached to the westernmost end of the school.
Alvord Middle School (grades 6-8)
 The middle school was moved into in the fall of 2009.
Alvord Elementary School (grades PK-5)
Up until 2008, Alvord Elementary did not have pre-school.

See also

List of school districts in Texas
List of high schools in Texas

References

External links
Alvord ISD

School districts in Wise County, Texas
School districts in Montague County, Texas